The Margaret River Pro 2019 was the fourth event of the Men's Championship Tour in the 2019 World Surf League. It took place from 29 May to 4 June in Margaret River, Western Australia, and was contested by 36 surfers.

In the final, Hawaii's John John Florence defeated American Kolohe Andino to win the seventh Championship Tour event of his career.

Format

A new competition format was introduced for the 2019 Championship Tour. All 36 surfers take part in the Seeding Round. The top two surfers in each heat advance directly to the Round of 32, while the lowest-placed surfer in each heat enters the Elimination Round. In each of the four heats in the Elimination Round, the top two surfers advance to the Round of 32, while the lowest-placed surfer is eliminated from the competition. From the Round of 32 onwards, the competition follows a single elimination format, with the winner of each head-to-head heat advancing to the next round and the loser being eliminated.

Competition

Bracket

The competition took place from 29 May to 4 June.

Seeding Round

Elimination round

Round of 32

Round of 16

Quarterfinals

Semifinals

Final

References

External links

 World Surf League

Margaret River Pro
2019 World Surf League
2019 in Australian sport
Sports competitions in Western Australia
May 2019 sports events in Australia
June 2019 sports events in Australia